Wirtemberg Castle, a ruined hilltop castle, is the second family seat of the House of Württemberg, whose ancestors had abandoned Beutelsbach Castle (also known as "Kappelberg Castle"). Between 1080 and 1819, three castles with this name existed in the area.

History

First castle 
The first castle was constructed in 1080 and has been described as "fortification with three surrounding walls, several buildings including extensive stables, a courtyard and a stately manor." The castle's chapel was consecrated on February 7, 1083.

Conrad I, Count of Württemberg documented the castle on May 2, 1092, signing as a witness. This is the oldest document featuring the name "Württemberg." From 1092 to 1495, the castle repeatedly served as the family seat of numerous counts of Württemberg. 1311 saw the first destruction of the castle by the forces of the neighboring Free imperial cities under Emperor Henry VII.

Second castle 
Reconstruction of the castle began in 1311, although in smaller dimensions than the original castle. The second castle was burned down in 1519 when the forces of the Swabian League under the command of William IV, Duke of Bavaria occupied most of Württemberg.

Third castle 

After the destruction of 1519, Duke Ulrich rebuilt the castle for the third and last time. Wirtemberg Castle was eventually dismantled in 1819 during the reign of William I after several hundreds years of neglect it had fallen into ruins.

Grave chapel 

From 1820 to 1824, Wilhelm I. had the Württemberg Mausoleum erected for his deceased wife Katharina at the site of the dismantled third castle. Designed by Giovanni Salucci in neoclassical style it has been open to the public since 1907.

Etymology 
The spelling of the castle's name has changed numerous times over the centuries. Previous names include Wirdeberch, Werdenberc, and Wirtinsberk. "Württemberg" became official after the establishment of the Kingdom of Württemberg under Napoleon. The humorous wordplay "Wirt am Berg" has been in common use to this day.

Gallery

References

Further reading 

 Albrecht Greule: Keltische Ortsnamen in Baden-Württemberg. Wir können alles – außer Latein. In: Archäologisches Landesmuseum Baden-Württemberg, Imperium Romanum. Roms Provinzen an Neckar, Rhein und Donau. catalogue. Esslingen 2005, pp. 80–84

External links
 

Castles in Stuttgart